St. Charles Borromeo Church (Dutch: Sint-Carolus Borromeuskerk) is a church in central Antwerp, located on the Hendrik Conscience square. It was built in 1615-1621 as the Jesuit church of Antwerp, which was closed in 1773. It was rededicated in 1779 to Saint Charles Borromeo. The church was formerly known for 39 ceiling pieces by Rubens that were lost in a fire when lightning struck the church on 18 July 1718.

History
The church was inspired by the Church of the Gesu, the mother church of the Society of Jesus, a Roman Catholic religious order also known as the Jesuits. 
The church was built next to the Huis van Aecken, bought from the heirs of Erasmus II Schetz.
It was the first church in the world to be dedicated to the Jesuit founder, Ignatius Loyola.

In 1617-1618 Rubens painted two altarpieces. He was also commissioned to paint the ceiling pieces, for which he made the designs while the execution was done mostly by pupils, including Anthony van Dyck. A contract was drawn up in 1620 by Jacobus Tirinus and the paintings were delivered a year later in time for the consecration. Rubens received 7,000 guilders for his works in the church, and though the lavish decorations including sculptures and other artwork were well received, Tirinus was dismissed in 1625 for going beyond his budget.

In 1718 the vault of the nave, including Rubens' ceiling paintings, was destroyed by fire. Jan Pieter van Baurscheidt the Elder restored the damaged parts according to the original plan, but replaced the original coffers with wide transverse arches. In 1773 the Society of Jesus was suppressed and the building was confiscated. It reopened in 1779, renamed St.-Carolus Borromeuskerk, after Charles Borromeo.

Since 1803 the St.-Carolus Borromeuskerk has been in use as a parish church. During the Dutch reign preceding Belgium's independence in 1830 the baroque interior was sobered to make it a Protestant church.

A restoration campaign in the 1980s brought back the churches baroque splendor. Besides works by Rubens the interior displays paintings by Gerard Seghers, Daniel Seghers, and Cornelis Schut.

On 30 August 2009 fire broke out again, but none of the important artworks were damaged.

Gallery

See also
 List of Jesuit sites
 List of Catholic churches in Belgium

References

External links

Carol
Carol
Carol
1625 establishments in the Habsburg Netherlands
Jesuit history in Europe
Charles Borromeo